Stars of Space Jam is a collection of Looney Tunes VHS tapes released on 1997 to promote the release of Space Jam. A Japanese LaserDisc of this set was released around the same time. Each tape/side featured six cartoons, most of which had not been made available on home video before. This was also notably the first video series with a video featuring all the cartoons of the Tasmanian Devil. The series was discontinued around the time the Looney Tunes Presents video series came out.

Each tape in this series began with a short version of the "Warner Bros. Family Entertainment" logo as seen on Warner Bros. Animation's cartoon shows (albeit with a short Merrie Melodies fanfare).

DVD releases have been released on October 9, 2018, with some slight changes to the Bugs Bunny and Daffy Duck releases.

In addition to the separate DVDs, a stand-alone single disc collection was announced. Containing all 30 cartoons from all five sets, it was released as Volume 1, meaning there could be more volumes planned.

Character volumes

Dubbed versions
Some televised versions of the cartoons from the Stars of Space Jam tapes contain a dubbed version disclaimer at the end of the cartoons labelled "DUBBED VERSION (C) 1997 WARNER BROS.", although these copies with "dubbed version" disclaimer are never seen on American television. The reason behind the dubbed version disclaimer was because a music-and-effects dub track was created for foreign dubs, although unlike the THIS VERSION 1997/1998 dubbed versions commonly seen on television and some European VHS tapes (Bugs & Friends, Superior Duck, From Hare To Eternity, Greedy For Tweety, Wideo Wabbit, 'Cheese Chasers, The Prize Pest, A Fractured Leghorn, Big House Bunny, Scaredy Cat, Feed The Kitty) these prints are not restored at all. 
Like the THIS VERSION 1997/1998 WB dubbed versions succeeding them, the original end cards are preserved, unlike the dubbed versions created by Turner Entertainment in 1995.

Notes
On the DVD version of Stars of Space Jam, on the Bugs Bunny DVD collection, "Barbary-Coast Bunny" is replaced by "Ali Baba Bunny", while on the Daffy Duck DVD collection, "Holiday for Drumsticks" is replaced by "Daffy Duck Slept Here". 
On the DVD version of Stars of Space Jam, all cartoon shorts which had already been restored and remastered for DVD and Blu-ray have their previous unrestored prints from the original Stars of Space Jam 1996 VHS collection have been replaced by their latest restored Blu-ray/DVD transfers, though shorts that are not yet restored, such as "Hot Cross Bunny", "Hare Splitter", "Boston Quackie", "Hot-Rod and Reel!" and "Zip 'n Snort" still keep their previous unrestored transfers from the 1996 VHS collection. However, on the Sylvester and Tweety DVD collection, both "Tree Cornered Tweety" and "Tweet Zoo" still keep their unrestored VHS transfers, despite both shorts having been restored and remastered for the I Love Tweety Volume 2 Japanese DVD, for reasons unknown. 

Both the restored transfers of "Apes of Wrath" and "Person to Bunny" are presented in their original correct 4:3 aspect ratios on this DVD set, as opposed to the cropped widescreen versions as seen on their respective Looney Tunes Super Stars DVD sets they originated from.

Much like the original 1996 VHS collection, all the cartoons on the 2018 DVD collection are uncut and uncensored. 

The entire contents of the Tasmanian Devil DVD collection were previously released on the Looney Tunes Platinum Collection Volume 1 Blu-ray set (consisting of all five fully restored Taz cartoons from the "classic" era, "Devil May Hare", "Bedevilled Rabbit", "Ducking the Devil", "Bill of Hare", and "Dr. Devil and Mr. Hare", in their correct 4:3 formats, including "Fright Before Christmas" as a bonus feature on the Blu-ray set).

On the DVD version of Stars of Space Jam, on the Tasmanian Devil DVD collection, "Fright Before Christmas" is presented as the last 10 minutes of the TV special Bugs Bunny's Looney Christmas Tales, including the surrounding bridging sequences and the special's entire end credits, beginning with the part where Bugs and the gang are caroling to "Jingle Bells", as opposed to the stand-alone version of the short (with recreated titles) seen on past home video releases and on TV airings.

In Europe, there is an additional VHS tape in this Stars of Space Jam VHS compilation called Stars of Space Jam: Space Tunes, which, unlike the other VHS tapes in this collection, which mainly focus on only one specific Looney Tunes character, it features a variety of Looney Tunes shorts based on the theme of outer space, including some Marvin the Martian cartoons. This tape, however, is not found in the United States: instead it has been released on VHS in the United States as part of Looney Tunes Presents and is referred to as Marvin the Martian: Space Tunes. It is unknown if Space Tunes was also included in the European release of the Stars of Space Jam 2018 DVD collection.

References

Looney Tunes home video releases